Hin Sam Wan is a 75-million-year-old rock formation protruding out of a mountain in Phou Sing, Bueng Kan Province, Thailand, near the Mekong River. It is so named because, from certain angles, the rocks look like a family of whales. Only two of the rocks (the "mother whale" and "father whale") are accessible by foot; the "baby whale" cannot be reached.

References

External links
"Hin-Sam-Wan, Bueng Kan Province" – Oriental Escape

Landforms of Thailand
Mountains of Thailand
Geography of Bueng Kan province